King Yanabe Yalangway was the eractasswa (chief) of the Catawba Indian Nation, sometime around the 1740s. Not much is known about him other than the fact that he preceded King Hagler as chief. His training was evidently under "king" Whitmannetaughehee's leadership.

As a warrior he served during a longstanding state of warfare with northern tribes, particularly the Iroquois Seneca, and the Lenape (aka Delaware), an Algonquian-speaking people who had occupied coastal areas and had become vassals of the Iroquois after migrating  to Ohio Valley. The Catawba chased their raiding parties back to the north in the 1720s and 1730s, going across the Potomac River. At one point, a party of Catawba is said to have followed a party of Lenape who attacked them, and to have overtaken them near Leesburg, Virginia. There they fought a pitched battle.

Similar encounters in this tireless warfare were reported to have occurred at present-day Franklin, West Virginia (1725), Hanging Rocks and the mouth of the Potomac South Branch in West Virginia, and near the mouths of Antietam Creek (1736) and Conococheague Creek in Maryland. Mooney asserted that the name of Catawba Creek in Botetourt came from an encounter in these wars with the northern tribes, not from the Catawba having lived there.

The colonial governments of Virginia and New York held a council at Albany, New York in 1721, attended by delegates from the Six Nations (Haudenosaunee) and the Catawba. The colonists asked for peace between the Confederacy and the Catawba, however the Six Nations reserved the land west of the Blue Ridge mountains for themselves, including the Indian Road or Great Warriors' Path (later called the Great Wagon Road) through the Pennsylvania, Virginia, North Carolina and Georgia backcountry. This heavily traveled path, used until 1744 by Seneca war parties, went through the Shenandoah Valley to the South.

In 1738, a smallpox epidemic broke out in South Carolina. It caused many deaths, not only among the Anglo-Americans, but especially among the Catawba and other related tribes, such as the Waxhaw, Wateree, Congaree, Sugeree, Santee, Waccamaw, Winyaw, Sissipahaw, Shakori, Enoke, Cheraw, Peedee, Dawhee, etc. Eventually after this epidemic,  Yanabe Yalangway became the paramount chief of the Catawba people, not necessarily as Whitmannetaugheehee's direct successor. The Sissipahaw, Shakori, Enoke and possibly some other small tribe were absorbed into the Catawba people to survive themselves and to strengthen Yanabe Yalangway's people.

Yanabe Yalangway was paramount chief of the Catawba people when, in 1744, the Treaty of Lancaster, made at Lancaster, Pennsylvania, renewed the Covenant Chain between the Iroquois and the colonists and the governor of Virginia, who had not been able to prevent settlers going into Iroquois territory, offered the tribe payment for their land claim. The peace was probably final for the Iroquois, who had established the Ohio Valley as their preferred hunting ground by right of conquest, but the more western tribes continued warfare against the Catawba, who were now so reduced as for their own number that they could raise little resistance. In 1744 the Natchez and Pedee attacked and killed several Catawba people and the Catawba drove them into European settlements. During the "King George's War" (1744-1748) the Shawnee and, eventually, the Cherokee (but southern Shawnee were sometimes called "Cherokee") made their attacks against the Catawba and, when the Catawba tried to find a refuge in the Carolinian settlements, against these settlements too. "King" Yanabe Yalangway had to deal with these very difficult years and led the Catawba through a crucial period.

He was murdered in 1750 by a band of Iroquois, during a period of conflict with the Iroquois from the North. He was on his way home from Charleston following a conference with South Carolina's Colonial Governor James Glen.

References

1750 deaths
1750 crimes
Catawba people
Native American leaders
Murdered Native American people
People murdered in South Carolina
Year of birth unknown
18th-century Native Americans